Linzi was the capital of the ancient Chinese state of Qi during the Zhou dynasty. The ruins of the city lie in modern-day Linzi District, Shandong, China. The city was one of the largest and richest in China during the Spring and Autumn Period. Upon occupying Linzi in 221 BC, King Ying Zheng of Qin completed his conquest of the Chinese rival states and declared himself the first emperor of China shortly afterwards. The ruins of the ancient city were excavated in 1926 by Japanese archaeologists and in 1964 by Chinese archaeologists.

Layout

The city was surrounded by a  perimeter wall of rammed earth. The city consisted of an outer city and an inner city. The city had a sewer and water supply system.

The palace was located in the inner city, located in the southwestern corner of Linzi. A large rammed earth platform was found inside the inner city, commonly referred to as the Duke Huan platform.

Four major avenues met in the northeast section of the city. This area yielded the richest cultural remains from the Western Zhou to the Han."

In the Records of the Grand Historian, the population of Linzi in the fourth and third centuries BC was said to be 70,000 households, with at least 210,000 adult males. Scholars today believe this was somewhat exaggerated.

Jixia Academy
The kings of Qi and the Qi state acted as patrons of the Jixia Academy (ca 315-285 BC) in Linzi, the earliest and largest (in its time) center of learning in China. The Academy, possibly named after the city gate (Ji) nearby, was made up of chosen scholars who received a handsome stipend from the government in return for advising the king on government, rites and philosophy. Among the Jixia Academy scholars were Mencius, Xun Zi (who taught Han Fei Zi and Li Si, among others), and Shen Dao.

Tombs

Many of the tombs around Linzi have been looted in antiquity. In pits near what is considered the tomb of Duke Jing of Qi, over 600 sacrificed horses have been found arranged in two rows.

Erroneous DNA test

An initial test of corpses from Linzi graves' mitochondrial DNA (mtDNA) claimed that their mtDNA was found to be more similar to Europeans than modern Chinese. The mtDNA was reexamined and the initial test was found to be wrong, with results showing European mtdna sharing no links to the remains found in the graves, and the study says it "highlight that ancient mtDNA data obtained under different sampling schemes and subject to potential contamination can easily create the impression of drastic spatiotemporal changes in the genetic structure of a regional population during the past few thousand years if inappropriate methods of data analysis are employed."

References

External sources
 Allan, Sarah (ed), The Formation of Chinese Civilization: An Archaeological Perspective, 

Ancient Chinese capitals
Archaeological sites in China
Chinese architectural history
Major National Historical and Cultural Sites in Shandong
Zibo